The 1816 Guatemala earthquake occurred at 15:30 UTC on 22 July. It was caused by movement on the Chixoy-Polochic Fault. The area affected by shaking up to intensity VII (Very strong) was at least 13,000 km2. At least 23 deaths were reported. The discovery of this earthquake 175 years after it occurred was based on study of historical documents, and is notable for showing that this portion of Guatemala, previously believed by many planners to be of low seismic risk, has experienced, and is at further risk of, very large earthquakes.

See also
 List of earthquakes in Guatemala
 List of historical earthquakes

References

Earthquakes in Guatemala
1816 earthquakes
1816 in North America
19th century in Guatemala
July 1816 events